Yuri Yevgenyevich Novoseltsev (born 26 March 1964) is a former Russian football player. He also holds Ukrainian citizenship.

References

1964 births
Living people
Soviet footballers
FC AGMK players
FC Okean Nakhodka players
Russian footballers
Russian Premier League players
FC Metalurh Zaporizhzhia players
Ukrainian Premier League players
FC Polissya Zhytomyr players

Association football defenders